The 1965 South American Basketball Championship for Women was the 10th regional tournament for women in South America. It was held in Rio de Janeiro, Brazil and won by the local squad. Seven teams competed.

Results
To define the final standings, each team played the other teams once in a round robin.

External links

South
B
South American Basketball Championship for Women
1965 in Brazilian women's sport
September 1965 sports events in South America
Bask